János Libényi (in archaic English sources: John Libényi, Csákvár, 8 December 1831 – Vienna, 26 February 1853) was a Hungarian tailor-servant who attempted to assassinate Austrian Emperor Franz Joseph. This was the first of seven assassination attempts against the Emperor.

Life

He was born to János Libényi Sr., tailor and chief-conductor of the local guild of tailors, and Erzsébet (Elisabeth) Lukács. He had previously worked as a tailor's assistant in Arad, and in 1850 he travelled to Pest and a year later to Vienna. With the help of the Russian intervention, the Hungarian Revolution of 1848 was crushed by Austrian army in 1849. While in Arad, he witnessed the execution of the 13 Martyrs of Arad, a tragic event that deeply angered and saddened him, thus he became involved in revolutionary movements. Libényi further claimed that the young Franz Joseph had  seduced his sister Margit (Margaret) after becoming entranced by her dancing at the Prater and had her educated at a girl's school. For Libényi, this 'humiliating and shameful event' was the last straw, and he decided to assassinate the emperor no matter what it took.

Assassination attempt and execution 
Libényi carried out the assassination attempt on 18 February 1853, when the Emperor was on the Kärtnertor Bastion Walk, the emperor's usual walking route, and leaned out over the parapet of the bastion to observe the soldiers exercising below. Then suddenly Libényi rushed forward and stabbed him in the back of the neck with a kitchen knife.

His attempt was thwarted by the intervention of Major Maximilian Karl Lamoral O'Donnell, an aide-de-camp, and the Viennese butcher Joseph Ettenreich, thus the Emperor escaped with a non-fatal wound. The life of the monarch, however, was not only saved due to the quick intervention, as Libényi's knife with the wrong side of the blade hit the hard collar of his jacket and slipped. This contributed greatly to the monarch's survival. Franz Joseph was confined to bed, and for a time his doctors feared that the Emperor might lose his sight and go blind.

Libényi was arrested, and during his interrogation he said that in 1849 he worked in the military tailor's workshop of the fortress of Arad and witnessed the execution of the martyrs of Arad. He decided then to take revenge on the Emperor who could have prevented the executions, but did nothing.

Libényi was tried by court martial and sentenced to death by hanging, which was carried out in February. On the site where he carried out the assassination, the Votivkirche (votive church) of Vienna was built.

The Viennese court responded to the various revolutionary movements with a wave of repression: arrests and executions and increased patrols and searches. According to local folklore the assassin from Csákvár was the reason why the railway never reached Csákvár.
Interestingly, the old city wall where the assassination took place was razed to the ground by Franz Joseph that same year, and the Ring, Vienna's Grand Boulevard, was built on its site.

References 

1831 births
1853 deaths
Failed regicides
Executed Hungarian people
People from Fejér County
People executed by the Austrian Empire